Marilyn Faye Parney is a Canadian singer/songwriter and horse rider, and has been called "Canada's Singing Cowgirl".

Early career
Born April 4, 1954 in Rosetown, Saskatchewan, Canada.  She became a stock car and snowmobile racing champion.  Raised on the family farm she grew up with a lifetime involvement with quarter horses.

Music career
After leaving her professional horse career, she focused full-time on her songwriting and performing in 1991 and performed shows in Alberta and Saskatchewan with Doug Hergott.  Her first album self-titled was released in 1992 and featured four singles including "Paradise", a ballad featured in the movie "My Mother's Ghost" and "Cowgirls Prayer" which won 1995 Video Of The Year at the Saskatchewan Country Music Awards ("SMCA").

As an active force in Saskatchewan Country Music Awards she received numerous nominations and awards at the SCMA (Saskatchewan Country Music Awards) including Entertainer Of The Year in 1997.

SCMA Awards Won
1997 Entertainer of the Year
1997 Song of the Year - "Paradise" composed by Marilyn Faye Parney
1995 Video of the year - "Cowgirls Prayer"

SCMA Nominations
Marilyn and her bandmates have received 46 nominations since 1994
Entertainer of the Year 1998 97 96 95 94
Female Vocalist 1998 97 95 94
Song of the Year 1997 96 95 94
Single of the Year 1997 95 94
Manager of the Year 1998 97 96
Video (for Cowgirls Prayer) 1995
Booking Agent 1997
Bass Guitar - Terry Hoknes (MFP band) 1998 97 96 95 94
Keyboards - Terry Hoknes (MFP band) 1998 97 96 95
Guitar Player - Terry Hoknes (MFP band) 1998 97
Producer - Terry Hoknes (MFP band) 1995
Producer - Doug Hergott (MFP band) 1995
Bass Guitar - Boyd Faulkner (MFP band) 1998 97
Guitar Player - Bob Hoknes (MFP band) 1996
Guitar Player - Rod Jenson (MFP band) 1995
Drums - Gord Moyer (MFP band) 1998 97
Drums - Brett Brissaw (MFP band) 1994
Backup Band - Rose County (MFP band) 1998 97
Touring Band - Rose County (MFP band) 1996 95 94

Touring Bands
Marilyn formed the band "Legend" in 1992 to tour and promote her debut album featuring Doug Hergott on lead guitar.  The next year she formed a new lineup called "Rose County" to tour including Dean Kaplan, Tom Cunningham, Brett Brissaw and Terry Hoknes which toured in late 1993 across Western Canada.  New lineup changes later included Billy Ray Houston, Michael Machetti, Keith Read and Gord Moyer.

Duo
From 1995 to 2003 she toured back and forth across Western Canada with partner Terry Hoknes.   Hoknes created a fully sequenced show to perform Marilyn's music as well as other material.  They also toured Western Australia in late 1997 and performed in France including the Mirande, France Country Music Festival in July 2001.  At this time Marilyn began to co-write with other songwriters including Mick DallaVee as well as TV and radio interviews to promote her music.

Unbridled Heart - Second Album
She began to work on a second album in 1995 with Terry Hoknes and Doug Hergott with whom she co-wrote material and produced various demo recordings. Eventually she teamed with Mike Norman.  The second album titled "Unbridled Heart" was recorded in Vancouver, BC, Canada and produced by Mike Norman (multi-instrumentalist for recording artist Suzanne Gitzi) and featured performances by top performers as Tony Rudner (nominated Canadian Country Music Producer of the Year 1998 for past work with Farmers Daughter), Tom McKillup (recording artist Lisa Brokup) plus a guest performance by solo recording artist Gary Fjellgard.   The new album featured 11 new songs all co-written by Marilyn which feature a great variety of musical styles and moods. The first single "How Can I Dance With You" hit #79 nationally on the Canadian Country Charts. The follow-up single "To Say I Love You" hit #50 nationally in 1999.

Sultry Summer Nights - Third Album
Marilyn and Terry Hoknes began co-writing new songs for a new album in 2001 and both ventured to Nashville for further co-writing including a son with John Greenebaum writer of the #1 country song Third Rock From The Sun performed by Joe Diffie.   The album was recorded in Saskatoon produced by Terry Hoknes and engineered by Neil Meckelborg of Audio Art Studios.

Mold Exposure
While traveling Marilyn and Terry Hoknes both were affected from exposure to Stachybotrus mold.  This has led to Marilyn writing a book titled "Toxic House On The Prairie" about her health issues and how to deal with mold.

Car Accident
Marilyn and Terry Hoknes were in a car accident in 2003 which happened near the end of their touring. Marilyn has performed a few shows with David Evans. Marilyn is now based in Saskatoon, Saskatchewan, and still performs and writes.

References

External links

1954 births
Canadian women country singers
Canadian country singer-songwriters
Canadian rock musicians
Living people
Musicians from Saskatchewan
People from Rosetown